Camp Pickett can be:

Camp Pickett (San Juan Island) on San Juan Island disputed territory with British Canada during the Pig War.  Now within San Juan Island National Historical Park.
Fort Pickett in Virginia originally Camp Pickett until renamed in 1974.